Ximena García Lecuona is a Mexican–American screenwriter and film producer. She is best known for writing the 2022 American coming-of-age romantic comedy film Anything's Possible.

Biography 
García Lecuona was born and raised in Mexico. She came out as nonbinary and later came out as a transgender woman.

She made her debut as a screenwriter and as an executive producer with the film Anything's Possible, directed by Billy Porter. García Lecuona wrote the story to Anything's Possible about "trans joy" and "trans love." The film premiered at Outfest Los Angeles LGBTQ+ Film Festival, which she attended.

She was honored as one of Variety "Screenwriters to Watch" at the Mill Valley Film Festival in 2022.

In August 2022, García Lecuona adapted Sara Jo Cuff's LGBT coming-of-age story The Kiss List into a screenplay, which will be directed by Sonía Sebastian. The initial story, about a girl who makes a list of guys she wants to kiss, was changed by García Lecuona to make the protagonist bisexual. The film was developed by MarVista Entertainment.

External links 
Ximena García Lecuona IMDB

References 

Living people
Year of birth missing (living people)
21st-century American screenwriters
21st-century Mexican screenwriters
American women film producers
American women screenwriters
Hispanic and Latino American women in the arts
LGBT Hispanic and Latino American people
LGBT producers
American LGBT screenwriters
Mexican women film producers
Mexican women screenwriters
Transgender women
American transgender writers